Sesame Seed Candy or Tiler Khaja is a type of confectionery made from sesame seeds produced in Kushtia District of Bangladesh which is well known to the people of the country including Kushtia. The shape of this confectionery is flattened and oblong. Peeled sesame seeds are spread on it and the inside is slightly hollow.

Origin
There are some theories about the origin of this famous confectionery of Kushtia. According to history, this item appeared in Kushtia of East Bengal while India was undivided. The locals of Kushtia refer to the Teli community as the inventors of this confectionery.

After 1971, a factory at Charmilpara, Kushtia that produce Tiler Khaja was opened.

Ingrediants
Ingrediants for Tiler Khaja are:
Sugar
Sesame
Milk
Cardamom
Water

Recipe
First, sugar, water, milk, etc. are boiled in a pan for ten to twelve minutes. In this way the sugar will melt and mix with other ingredients. This hot mixture or pure sugar is then poured out of the pot to cool. When it cools down, the sticky sugar mixture or paste is lifted and tied in a loop. Usually after a few minutes the two of them complete the process of pulling and lengthening this adhesive mixture. This causes the inside to swell and the color to turn white.

See also
 Zaotang

References

Kushtia District
Bangladeshi confectionery
Bengali desserts
Bangladeshi cuisine